(born September 30, 1991) is a Filipino-Japanese karateka. Representing the Philippines, she won the gold medal in the women's kumite 50kg event at the 2022 World Games in Birmingham, United States.

Early life and education 
Junna Tsukii was born in Pasay, Philippines on September 30, 1991. She was born to Shin Tsukii, a Japanese coach, and Lilia Villanueva, a Filipino woman. Junna is the second eldest among three children. She moved to Japan when she was three years old.

She went to a junior high school in Kansai
She studied at Takushoku University in Tokyo, Japan. She would obtain a teacher's license for social studies and went back to her alma mater in Kansai to teach.

Career 
Tsukii took up karate at age seven joining her own father's dojo in Japan. She would rise to become a national champion in Japan when she was on her second year in junior high school and selected to represent the country internationally. However she was hindered by serious injuries at age 17. She tried to return to the Japanese national team while recovering from injuries but she later decide to represent the Philippines in 2017.

Representing the Philippines, Tsukii won one of the bronze medals in the women's kumite 50 kg event at the 2018 Asian Games held in Jakarta, Indonesia. In her bronze medal match she defeated Paweena Raksachart of Thailand.

In 2019, Tsukii won the gold medal in the women's kumite 50 kg event at the Southeast Asian Games held in the Philippines. In 2017, she won one of the bronze medals in this event at the Southeast Asian Games held in Kuala Lumpur, Malaysia. That year, she also won one of the bronze medals in the team kumite event.

In 2021, Tsukii won the gold medal in her event at the Karate 1-Premier League event held in Lisbon, Portugal. In June 2021, she competed at the World Olympic Qualification Tournament held in Paris, France hoping to qualify for the 2020 Summer Olympics in Tokyo, Japan. She did not qualify as she was eliminated in her first match by Ivet Goranova of Bulgaria. In November 2021, she competed in the women's 50 kg event at the World Karate Championships held in Dubai, United Arab Emirates. She was eliminated in her second match. In December 2021, she won the silver medal in her event at the Asian Karate Championships held in Almaty, Kazakhstan.

Tsukii won the gold medal in the women's kumite 50 kg event of the 2022 World Games held in Birmingham, United States.

Personal life
Tsukii cannot speak Tagalog well and learned English while she was in Japan but found her education on the language inadequate which initially made her doubt herself if she is fit to represent the Philippines. She would learn how to sing Lupang Hinirang, the national anthem, when she first became a represantives of the country to compensate for her lack of fluency in Tagalog.

She also manages her own YouTube channel were she holds karate web seminars.

Achievements

References 

Living people
1991 births
People from Pasay
Filipino female karateka
Japanese female karateka
Karateka at the 2018 Asian Games
Medalists at the 2018 Asian Games
Asian Games medalists in karate
Asian Games bronze medalists for the Philippines
Southeast Asian Games gold medalists for the Philippines
Southeast Asian Games bronze medalists for the Philippines
Southeast Asian Games medalists in karate
Competitors at the 2017 Southeast Asian Games
Competitors at the 2019 Southeast Asian Games
Competitors at the 2021 Southeast Asian Games
Competitors at the 2022 World Games
World Games gold medalists
World Games medalists in karate
Filipino people of Japanese descent
Takushoku University alumni
20th-century Filipino women
21st-century Filipino women
20th-century Japanese women
21st-century Japanese women